Göta kanal eller Vem drog ur proppen? (English: Göta Canal or Who Pulled the Plug?) is a Swedish comedy film which was released to cinemas in Sweden on 18 December 1981 directed by Hans Iveberg and starring Janne 'Loffe' Carlsson and Kim Anderzon.

Plot 
A rich Arab wants to place a huge order of 1000 motorboats. The multinational Uniship and the smaller company Anderssons båtvarv compete for the contract. When the buyer can't reach a decision he wants the boats to compete in a race from Stockholm, through Göta kanal, to Göteborg. The winner of the race will win the contract. The competitors are ready to win at all cost.

Cast (selection)

Carina crew 
 Janne 'Loffe' Carlsson - Janne Andersson
 Kim Anderzon - Lena Andersson
 Stig Ossian Ericson - Sigurd

Uniship crew 
 Yvonne Lombard - Rut
 Nils Eklund - Rune
 Stig Engström - Björn H:son Larsson

Others 
 Magnus Härenstam - Peter Black, kronofogde
 Rolv Wesenlund - Ole
 Per Oscarsson - Exportföreningens representative
 Georg Rydeberg - Gustav, slussvakt
 Peter Harryson - Polis
 Svante Grundberg - Kanotisten
 Nadim Sawalha - Sheikh Kahlifa bin Hirscham al Saba
 Lars Amble - Leif Andersson
 Marie Göranzon - Astrid Ohlson
 Frank Andersson - Man i båt
 Kent Andersson - Göteborgare
 Weiron Holmberg - Göteborgare
 Gösta Engström - Husvagnskille
 Sune Mangs - Serviceman
 Bertil Norström - Slussvakt
 Anders Nyström - Tage, fiskare
 Bosse Parnevik - Carl XVI Gustaf
 Christer Lindarw - Queen Silvia
 Anna-Lotta Larsson - Spådam
 Ulf Brunnberg - Båtpolis
 Michael Segerström - Slussvakt
 Mona Seilitz - Sivan
 Johan Thorén - stuntman
 Jannis Pesketzis - Grek

Production 
Filming took place between 13 July - 30 September 1981.

The two boats in the film are Orrskär 1000 (Carina) and Storebro's Storö 31 Baltic (Uniship).

A documentary, Hur dom drog ur proppen, was made about, by Swedish means, advanced stunts.

Reception 

The film was a huge success in Sweden and was seen by over 1.5 million people. Two sequels were made, in 2006 and 2009.

The audience criticized the film for the sound. The film's screenwriter and director Hans Iveberg answered in Expressen by blaming the tradition in Swedish film making where sound almost resembles that of radio theatre.

In 1983 an article in Eskilstuna-Kuriren reported about a conference where the use of product placement in the film was an issue. There was discussions on whether the film should be taxed for this. Iveberg denied being sponsored but Urban Jäfvert and Per Håkansson at University of Stockholm had confirmed that products were exposed in the film in exchange for the crew using them.

References

External links 
 
 

1981 films
1981 comedy films
Swedish comedy films
1980s Swedish-language films
Boat racing films
Films scored by Björn Isfält
1980s Swedish films